is a private distance learning university in Nishi-ku, Yokohama, Kanagawa Prefecture, Japan. It was established in 2004.

External links
 Official website 

Educational institutions established in 2004
Private universities and colleges in Japan
Universities and colleges in Yokohama
2004 establishments in Japan